Shwe Shwe Sein Latt (born 29 June 1966) is a Burmese politician who currently serves as a House of Nationalities MP for Bago Region No.3 Constituency. She is a member of the National League for Democracy.

Early life
Shwe Shwe was born on 29 June 1966 in Taungoo, Bago Region, Myanmar. She graduated  B.Sc (Hons) (Geology), M.Sc (Remote Sensing & GIS). Her previous job is facilitator (Freelance Consultant).

Political career
She is a member of the National League for Democracy Party politician. In the 2015 Myanmar general election, she was elected as Amyotha Hluttaw MP, winning a majority of 129008 votes and elected representative from Bago Region No.3 parliamentary constituency.

References

National League for Democracy politicians
1966 births
Living people
People from Bago Region